"Beneath with Me" is a song by American DJ Kaskade and Canadian electronic music producer Deadmau5. It features vocals from American singer-songwriter Skylar Grey. This is the third collaborative single by Kaskade and Deadmau5, having previously worked together on "I Remember" and "Move for Me".

Music video 
Skylar Grey appears in the music video. She is injured in the aftermath a car accident with her companion (played by an unknown actor) lying unconscious to the side of the road. Grey crawls out of the car as she sings through her pain and limps toward a light in the distance before the video focuses away from her to her companion, who awakens and runs towards the car. He pulls Grey (who was likely having an out-of-body experience) out of the car as she regains consciousness.

Track listing
Track listing taken from iTunes

Release history

References

External links
 Music Video on YouTube

2016 singles
Kaskade songs
Deadmau5 songs
Skylar Grey songs
2016 songs
Songs written by Finn Bjarnson
Songs written by Kaskade
Songs written by Deadmau5
Songs written by Skylar Grey